Manoj Manoharan (born 11 January 1991) is an Indian footballer who last played for Quartz S.C.

Career

Chirag United Kerala
After spending a season as a youth player at Pune F.C. Manoj signed with I-League side Chirag United Club Kerala. He then made his debut in the 2011 Indian Federation Cup against Air India FC on 22 September 2011.

Quartz Soccer Club
On 26 September 2012, it was announced that Manoj had signed for Quartz S.C. for the 2012 I-League 2nd Division.

Career statistics

Club
Statistics accurate as of 14 November 2011

References

Indian footballers
1991 births
Living people
I-League players
Footballers from Thrissur
Association football forwards
Chirag United Club Kerala players